The  was a type of cargo ship of Japan, serving during the 1930s and World War II. Four of the five ships of the class were converted to seaplane tenders during the war.

History
In 1930, the Ōsaka Mercantile Steamship Co.Ltd. (O.S.K. Lines) put into service the Kinai Maru-class cargo ship on the Japan-New York route.  Competing Japanese steamship companies produced and placed their own cargo ships on the North America route. 

In 1936, the Kawasaki Line built four Kamikawa Maru-class ships. They had much higher cruising speeds and capacity than their competitors. However, they were commandeered in sequence and did not survive to the end of the war.

Ships in class

Service

Photos

Footnotes

Bibliography
Tashirō Iwashige, The visual guide of Japanese wartime merchant marine,  (Japan), May 2009
Shinshichirō Komamiya, The Wartime Convoy Histories,  (Japan), October 1987
Monthly Ships of the World,  (Japan)
No. 481, Special issue Vol. 40, History of Japanese aircraft carriers, May 1994
No. 525, June 1997
No. 600, September 2002
Science of the Ships No. 403, Ministry of Transport, May 1982
The Maru Special, Japanese Naval Vessels No. 25, Japanese seaplane tenders w/ auxiliary seaplane tenders,  (Japan), March 1979

World War II naval ships of Japan
 
Cargo ships
Auxiliary depot ship classes